Smoketown is a name given various areas populated by African Americans in the United States. The term may refer to:

Smoketown, Louisville, a neighborhood of Louisville, Kentucky
Smoketown, Pennsylvania, a census-designated place in Lancaster County
Smoketown, Franklin County, Pennsylvania, an unincorporated community
Smoketown: The Untold Story of the Other Great Black Renaissance, a book about Pittsburgh's accomplished and historic African American community by Mark Whitaker